General elections were held in Botswana on 18 October 1969, the first since independence in September 1966. The result was a second successive landslide victory for the Botswana Democratic Party (BDP), who won 24 of the 31 elected seats, including three in which they were unopposed.

Campaign
A total of 77 candidates contested the elections. The BDP put up a full slate of 31 candidates, whilst the Botswana National Front had 21, the Botswana People's Party had 15, the Botswana Independence Party had nine, and there was also a single independent candidate.

The Botswana National Front was founded following the 1965 elections, and was headed by Kenneth Koma. However, Koma was overshadowed by Bathoen II, the paramount chief of the Bangwaketse. Bathoen abdicated his throne to become BNF president, and had also resigned from the Ntlo ya Dikgosi, which he regarded as powerless. He was the first traditional leader to run in an election.

Results

References

Elections in Botswana
Botswana
General
Election and referendum articles with incomplete results